Half Tide Rock is a small rocky island with an area of 0.13 ha, in south-eastern Australia.  It is part of the Petrel Island Group, lying in Bass Strait close to Walker and Robbins Islands in north-west Tasmania.

Fauna
Recorded breeding seabird, shorebird species include sooty oystercatcher and black-faced cormorant.

References

Islands of Bass Strait